CL DAV Public School was started by Mahatma Hans Raj in April, 1982. The School is named after Lala Chaman Lal who served as the Principal of A.S Higher Secondary School at Jalandhar for 40 Years. The Dictum of CL DAV Public School is "From darkness to light, from light to enlightenment".

Courses
Science  PCM, PCB
Commerce  Accountancy, Business Studies, Economics
Arts   Geography, Political Science, Economics

Languages taught
English
Hindi
Sanskrit (Class 5 to 10)

Faculty
Ms. Anjali Marriya, Principal
Ms. Rosy Uppal, Coordinator Senior Wing
Ms.Shailja Sharma, Coordinator Middle Wing
Ms. Seema Gandhi, Controller of Examination
Ms.Anju Ratra, Coordinator Junior Wing

See also
Education in India
Literacy in India  
List of institutions of higher education in Haryana

References

External links
CL DAV Public School, Panchkula Official Website

Schools in Haryana